A Commonwealth organisation is an organisation affiliated with the Commonwealth of Nations. This article is a list of such organisations, which include societies, institutions, associations, organisations, funds and charities that support the Commonwealth.

In some cases, such as Sight Savers International and the English-Speaking Union, they operate outside the Commonwealth, though their operations began and largely remain within the Commonwealth.

List of organisations
The following organisations are affiliated with the Commonwealth:

 Commonwealth Foundation
 Commonwealth Secretariat
 Commonwealth of Learning
 Commonwealth Association of Tax Administrators
 Conference of Commonwealth Meteorologists
 Commonwealth Games Federation
 Commonwealth Education Trust
 Commonwealth Local Government Forum
 Commonwealth Parliamentary Association
 Commonwealth Telecommunications Organisation
 African Centre for Democracy and Human Rights Studies
 Association of Commonwealth Literature and Language Studies
 Association of Commonwealth Universities
 Association of Commonwealth Leaders’ Conferences
 Association of International Accountants
 Chartered Insurance Institute
 Commission on Science and Technology for Sustainable Development in the South
 Common Age
 Commonwealth Association for Health and Disability
 Commonwealth Association of Legislative Counsel
 Commonwealth Association of Architects
 Commonwealth Association of Law Reform Agencies
 Commonwealth Association of Museums
 Commonwealth Association of Paediatrics Gastroenterology and Nutrition
 Commonwealth Association of Planners
 Commonwealth Association of Public Accounts Committees
 Commonwealth Association of Science, Technology and Mathematics Educators
 Commonwealth Association of Surveying and Land Economy
 Commonwealth Boxing Council
 Commonwealth Businesswomen’s Network
 Commonwealth Consortium for Education
 Commonwealth Council for Education Administration and Management
 Commonwealth Countries League
 Commonwealth Dental Association
 Commonwealth Disabled People’s Forum
 Commonwealth Equality Network
 Commonwealth Engineers Council
 Commonwealth Enterprise and Investment Council
 Commonwealth Forestry Association
 Commonwealth Geographical Bureau
 Commonwealth Girls Education Fund
 Commonwealth HIV/AIDS Action Group
 Commonwealth Human Ecology Council
 Commonwealth Human Rights Initiative
 Commonwealth Jewish Council
 Commonwealth Journalists’ Association
 Commonwealth Judicial Education Institute
 Commonwealth Lawyers Association
 Commonwealth Legal Education Association
 Commonwealth Magistrates’ and Judges’ Association
 Commonwealth Medical Association
 Commonwealth Medical Trust
 Commonwealth Nurses and Midwives Federation
 Commonwealth Organisation for Social Work
 Commonwealth Pharmacists Association
 Commonwealth Trade Union Group
 Commonwealth Resounds
 Commonwealth Veterinary Association
 Commonwealth Women’s Network
 Corona Worldwide
 Royal Life Saving Society
 Royal Overseas League
 SightSavers International
 Soroptomist International
 The Commonwealth Association
 The Duke of Edinburgh’s International Award Foundation
 The Institute of Certified Bookkeepers
 The Round Table
 The Royal Commonwealth Society
 The Queen’s Commonwealth Trust
 Transparency International
 Towards Zero Foundation
 Women Mediators across the Commonwealth
 World Alliance for Citizen Participation CIVICUS
 Zalmi Foundation

Defunct organisations
The following now-defunct organisations were affiliated with the Commonwealth:
 British Empire and Commonwealth Museum
 Commonwealth Policy Studies Unit (CPSU)
 Commonwealth Press Union
 Commonwealth Business Council

Footnotes

External links 

 Commonwealth Accredited Organisations

 
Lists of organizations